Ichneumenoptera chrysophanes, the clearwing persimmon borer, is a moth of the family Sesiidae. It is found from Cairns in Queensland to Canberra in the Australian Capital Territory.

The length of the forewings is 7–8 mm for males and 7–10 mm for females. Adults are brown with large transparent areas on each wing. The body is sparsely covered in yellow hairs, and there is a large tuft of dark brown hairs on the tip of the abdomen.

The larvae bore in the inner bark of Alphitonia excelsa, the injured bark of Eucalyptus species, in branches of Ficus species, stems of Wisteria species and in woody galls on branches of Exocarpos cupressiformis. They are considered a pest on Diospyros kaki, of which they feed on the bark.

References

External links

Australian Faunal Directory
Australian Insects 
Classification of the Superfamily Sesioidea (Lepidoptera: Ditrysia) 
New records and a revised checklist of the Australian clearwing moths (Lepidoptera: Sesiidae)
Moths of Australia

Moths of Australia
Sesiidae
Moths described in 1886